Andrew Gunn (born July 15, 1969) is a Canadian film producer. His production company, Gunn Films, was started in 2001. He has worked with Walt Disney Pictures to produce movies such as Freaky Friday and Sky High. Gunn was born in Toronto, Ontario, Canada.

Gunn is one of the founders of Solstice Studios, based in Los Angeles.

Filmography (producer)
He was a producer in all films unless otherwise noted.

Film

As an actor

Television

As an actor

As writer

References

External links
 

Film producers from Ontario
Living people
People from Toronto
1969 births